Susan Feilding, Countess of Denbigh (née Villiers; 1583–1652), was an English courtier. She was First Lady of the Bedchamber to Queen Henrietta Maria in 1626–1652.

Life
Born Susan Villiers, she was the youngest daughter of Sir George Villiers and his wife, Mary Beaumont. About 1607, she married Sir William Feilding, who was later created Earl of Denbigh. The Countess of Denbigh was often at court, and rode to hunting on horseback with King James and her mother, the Countess of Buckingham, on 19 June 1624 (the King's birthday) from Wanstead House. 

She was appointed First Lady of the Bedchamber to the queen, Henrietta Maria, in 1626, and kept this office for the rest of her life. She was appointed in the midst of the king's purge of the queen's French household. Initially, the queen refused her because she was Protestant. When the king dismissed her French retinue, however, she asked Denbigh to assist her in acquiring the king's consent to let her French nurse Madame de Vantelet stay. Denbigh succeeded in this task by asking her brother to appeal to the king on the queen's behalf, after which the queen voluntarily agreed for her to become her principal lady-in-waiting. As principal lady-in-waiting, she has been referred to as both Mistress of the Robes as well as First Lady of the Bedchamber. 

During the English Civil War, her husband, the Earl of Denbigh, supported and fought for King Charles I of England, while her son, Basil, joined the Parliamentarian forces.  The Earl was wounded during an attack on Birmingham and died of his injuries in 1643.  The next year Susan fled to France with Queen Henrietta Marie. 

It was in France that Susan converted to Roman Catholicism, and in 1651, the council of state ordered the sequestration of all her property in England on the grounds that she had become Papist and was active in designs against the state. She was the patron of Richard Crashaw, who dedicated his sacred poems to her, in hearty acknowledgment of his immortal obligation to her goodness and charity, and addressed to her a poem persuading her — to render herself without further delay into the communion of the Catholic Church. 

The Countess died while in France, in 1652, and was buried in Église Saint-Eustache, Paris.

Issue
She had five children:

 Basil Feilding, 2nd Earl of Denbigh (ca. 1608–1675)
 George Feilding, 1st Earl of Desmond (ca. 1614–1665)
 Lady Margaret (1613–1638), married James Hamilton, 1st Duke of Hamilton.
 Lady Anne (died 1636), married Baptist Noel, 3rd Viscount Campden
 Lady Elizabeth, Countess of Guildford (died 1667), married Lewis Boyle, 1st Viscount Boyle.

See also
 Villiers family

References

1583 births
1652 deaths
English countesses
Wives of knights
First Ladies of the Bedchamber
Susan Feilding, Countess of Denbigh
Susan
Mistresses of the Robes
Household of Henrietta Maria
Daughters of British earls